The Young Mizo Association (YMA) is the largest and most comprehensive non-profit, secular, nongovernmental organisation of the Mizo people. It was established on 15 June 1935, originally as the Young Lushai Association (YLA), which was later replaced with the "Young Mizo Association" in 1947. It was initiated by the Welsh Christian missionaries who understood the need of cultural conservation of the Mizo tribe, who were under pressure of political and social modernisations. It was registered as SR No. 4 of 1977 under Indian Societies Registration Act (XXI of 1860) on 14 May 1977 to the Government of Mizoram.

The association is administered by a central committee (Central YMA), headquartered at Aizawl, and under which there are 5 sub-headquarters, 49 groups and 805 branches, which covers all of Mizoram and some parts of Assam, Manipur, Meghalaya, Nagaland and Tripura.

Vanlalruata was elected as the President for 2017 to 2019 term, and again for 2019 to 2021 term.

History

By 1935 Christianity had taken over most of the traditional Mizo lifestyle, formal education system had been introduced, British rule was about to be revoked and local administration was to be subjected to Indian politics. The basic tribal administrative system Zawlbuk was dissolving. The traditional social security, custom and training ground for young men was coming to an end, thereby necessitating a substitute of the tribal institution urgently. As serendipity would have it, a thunderstorm on the Monday evening of 3 June 1935, right after worship service, drove the Welsh missionaries and the Mizo church leaders to the nearby residence of Miss Kattie Hughes (known to Mizos as Pi Zaii), at Aijal (now Aizawl), wherein they made an impromptu proposal over a cup of tea for establishing an association that would unite all the Mizo people.  As a Christian gathering, the initial proposed name was Young Mizo Christian Association, to rhyme with Young Men's Christian Association (YMCA), which on scrutiny they noticed had a restrictive and religious fundamentalist connotation. Then Rev David Edward (Zorema Pa) came up with "Young Lushai Association" akin to their familiar Young Wales Association in Wales. The name was unanimously accepted. It was also agreed that the association would be formally inaugurated on the coming 15 June.

Though how many people and who were present on that night could not be ascertained, the following people were present:
Rev David Edward
Upa D. Ṭhianga
Rev L. Evans
Upa Chawngzika
Miss Kattie Hughes 
Pu Muka
Rev Chhuahkhama
Pu Vankhuma
Pu L. Kailuia
Pu L.H. Liana
Upa Ch. Pasena

YLA was unveiled on 5 June 1935 at the grand public meeting at Nepali School, Sikulpuikawn, with a candle lighting ceremony and election of the officials. Branches were soon created in every village, and all Mizo of age were soon registered members. The advent of Indian Independence incited new political and ethnic identity revivals in Mizoram (Lushai Hills, as it was called). For democratic administrative system, a political party was need. As the only and most endorsed organisation, YLA itself was suggested in 1945 to be the first political party. But the central committee objected to it, and this prompted the creation of an entirely political party, the Mizo Union. Then the terminology "Mizo" began to have new revolutionary meaning, it had much more inclusive and panoramic implications than "Lushai", which in any case was the Welshs' misnomer for "Lusei", a major clan of the Mizo tribe. Consequently, the central YLA committee resolved to change YLA to "Young Mizo Association" (YMA) on 7 October 1947.

Aims and objectives

Good use of leisure
Development of the Mizo society
Revere Christian ethics

The Ten Commitments

Young Mizo Association imposes its members of
Self-discipline and righteousness
Good management of family
Just and truthfulness
Tolerance
Politeness
Chivalry and usefulness
Social commitment
Respect for religion
Preservation of culture
Abstinence from liquor and drugs

Emblem and colour
The emblem, as described in the constitution of Young Mizo Association, is a flamed torch with which the abbreviation YMA is written, which is in turn held by a hand inside a circle. The three stems of the torch signify the three objectives of the association. The ten sparks of the torch signifies the ten commitments. In the ribbon where the name is written, there will be "ESTD"' written on the left side and 1935 on the right.

The official colour is a tricoloured horizontal stripe of equal sizes. The three colours represent the earliest man-made colours of the Mizo ancestors. First, red on top, denotes the brightness of the association. Second, white in the middle, shows sanctity. And the black bottom symbolizes a concern for the poor, the despair and the hapless.

Publications

Young Mizo Association publishes a monthly magazine YMA CHANCHINBU in Mizo since October 1973. It has a circulation of 10,000 copies. It also has a quarterly YMA News published in English.

Awards and recognition

Indira Priyadarshini Vrikshamitra Awards of 1986 from the Ministry of Environment and Forests, Government of India
Excellence Service Award from the Government of Mizoram for the three consecutive years, in 1988, 1989 and 1990.
Indira Gandhi Paryavaran Puraskar of 1993 from the Ministry of Environment and Forests, Government of India.
National Award for Outstanding Service in the field of Prevention of Alcoholism and Substance (Drug) Abuse as the "Best Non-Profit Institution" from the Ministry of Social Justice & Empowerment, Government of India. The award carries a medal, a citation and cash of INR 400,000. The award was presented by Pranab Mukherjee, the President of India, at Vigyan Bhawan, New Delhi, on 26 June 2013.

References

External links
Charity Localist
WISER
Karmayog
Mizoram
YMA Constitution

Organisations based in Mizoram
Youth organisations based in India
Organizations established in 1935
1935 establishments in India